"Now Until the Break of Day" is song credited to "Bazmark presents Christine Anu and David Hobson with Royce Doherty". It is included on Luhrmann's debut studio album, Something for Everybody (1998). The track peaked at number 50 in Australia. The song is an arrangement from the act 3 finale of Benjamin Britten's 1960 opera A Midsummer Night's Dream.

At the ARIA Music Awards of 1998, the Baz Luhrmann directed video won the ARIA award for Best Video.

Track listings
 "Now Until the Break of Day" (Radio edit)
 "Happy Feet" (High Heels Mix) (credited to Jack Hilton And His Orchestra)
 "Now Until the Break of Day" (Karaoke mix)
 "Now Until the Break of Day" (Feel Licks mix)

Chart positions

References

1960 songs
1997 singles
EMI Records singles
ARIA Award winners
Christine Anu songs
Electronic songs
Compositions by Benjamin Britten